August Adolf Eduard Eberhard Kundt (18 November 183921 May 1894) was a German physicist.

Early life
Kundt was born at Schwerin in Mecklenburg. He began his scientific studies at Leipzig, but afterwards went to Berlin University. At first he devoted himself to astronomy, but coming under the influence of H. G. Magnus, he turned his attention to physics, and graduated in 1864 with a thesis on the depolarization of light.

In 1867 he became privatdozent in Berlin University, and in the following year was chosen professor of physics at the Federal Polytechnic Institute in Zurich, where he was the teacher of Wilhelm Conrad Röntgen; then, after a year or two at Würzburg, he was called in 1872 to Strasbourg, where he took a great part in the organization of the new university, and was largely concerned in the erection of the Physical Institute.

Finally in 1888 he went to Berlin as successor to Hermann von Helmholtz in the chair of experimental physics and directorship of the Berlin Physical Institute. He died after a protracted illness at Israelsdorf, near Lübeck, on 21 May 1894.

Career
As an original worker, Kundt was especially successful in the domains of sound and light. In 1866, he developed a valuable method for the investigation of aerial waves within pipes, based on the fact that a finely divided powder, lycopodium for example, when dusted over the interior of a tube in which is established a vibrating column of air, tends to collect in heaps at the nodes, the distance between which can thus be ascertained. An extension of the method renders possible the determination of the velocity of sound in different gases. This experimental apparatus is called a Kundt's Tube.

In 1876, at Strasbourg in collaboration with Emil Warburg, Kundt proved that mercury vapour is a monatomic gas. In light, Kundt's name is widely known for his inquiries in anomalous dispersion, not only in liquids and vapours, but even in metals, which he obtained in very thin films by means of a laborious process of electrolytic deposition upon platinized glass.

He also carried out many experiments in magneto-optics, and succeeded in showing what Faraday had failed to detect, the rotation under the influence of magnetic force of the plane of polarization in certain gases and vapours.

Work was performed by Kundt on plant physiology and chlorophyll light frequencies absorption (Kundt's rule), centred on wavelengths of 6800 Å. This work may or may not have been complementary to E. Warburg work and theories. It was subsequently refined and expanded by R. Houston and O. Biermacher and others.

See also 

 Pyotr Lebedev

References

Sources

Further reading 
 D. Appleton (1894). The Popular Science Monthly. New York: D. Appleton. Page 270.
 Hortvet, J. (1902). A manual of elementary practical physics. Minneapolis: H.W. Wilson. Page 119+.
 Stefan L. Wolff, August Kundt (1839–1894): Die Karriere eines Experimentalphysikers, Physis 29.2 (1992), S. 403-446.

1839 births
1894 deaths
People from Schwerin
19th-century German physicists
Academic staff of the University of Strasbourg
Recipients of the Pour le Mérite (civil class)
Academic staff of ETH Zurich